is a Japanese former swimmer. He competed in the men's 1500 metre freestyle at the 1968 Summer Olympics.

References

External links
 

1946 births
Living people
Olympic swimmers of Japan
Swimmers at the 1968 Summer Olympics
Universiade medalists in swimming
Sportspeople from Niigata Prefecture
Asian Games medalists in swimming
Asian Games gold medalists for Japan
Asian Games silver medalists for Japan
Swimmers at the 1966 Asian Games
Medalists at the 1966 Asian Games
Universiade bronze medalists for Japan
Japanese male freestyle swimmers
Medalists at the 1967 Summer Universiade
20th-century Japanese people